The 1929 Saxony state election was held on 12 May 1929 to elect the 96 members of the Landtag of Saxony.

Results

References 

Saxony
Elections in Saxony
May 1929 events in Europe